Microcymatura macrophthalma is a species of beetle in the family Cerambycidae. It was described by Báguena and Stephan von Breuning in 1958.

References

Lamiinae
Beetles described in 1958